James Bailie (1890–1967) was a unionist politician in Northern Ireland.

Bailie worked as a domestic engineer and ran a foundry that produced ironworks in Ballymena.  He joined the Ulster Unionist Party and served on various public boards before being elected to the Senate of Northern Ireland in 1955, serving until his death in 1967.  From 1962 to 1963, he was a Deputy Speaker of the Senate.

References

1890 births
1967 deaths
Members of the Senate of Northern Ireland 1953–1957
Members of the Senate of Northern Ireland 1957–1961
Members of the Senate of Northern Ireland 1965–1969
Ulster Unionist Party members of the Senate of Northern Ireland